Cervantes is a crater on Mercury. It has a diameter of 181 kilometers. Its name was adopted by the International Astronomical Union in 1976. Cervantes is named for the Spanish writer Miguel de Cervantes, who lived from 1547 to 1616.

Cervantes is one of 110 peak ring basins on Mercury.

References

Impact craters on Mercury
Miguel de Cervantes